Ernest S. Williams (1885-1981) was the 5th General Superintendent of the Assemblies of God from 1929–1949.

Early life and  ministry 
Ernest Williams was born in San Bernardino, California, his family was active in the Holiness Movement. In 1904, he converted to Christianity, two years later he attended the Azusa Street Revival, making him the only General Superintendent to participate in the revival.

Theology
In his Systematic Theology, Williams periodically responds to Calvinist criticisms of his Arminian-like views.

Notes and references

Citations

Sources

1885 births
1981 deaths
20th-century Protestant theologians
American Christian theologians
American Pentecostal pastors
Arminian ministers
Arminian theologians
Assemblies of God people
Central Bible College
Pentecostal theologians
People from San Bernardino, California
Systematic theologians